Papineau is a village in Papineau Township, Iroquois County, Illinois, United States. The population was 171 at the 2010 census.

Geography

Demographics

As of the census of 2000, there were 196 people, 60 households, and 51 families residing in the village. The racial makeup of the village was 95.92% White, 3.06% African American, 0.51% Native American, and 0.51% from two or more races. 

There were 60 households, out of which 50.0% had children under the age of 18 living with them, 70.0% were married couples living together, 8.3% had a female householder with no husband present, and 15.0% were non-families. 13.3% of all households were made up of individuals, and 11.7% had someone living alone who was 65 years of age or older.  The average household size was 3.27 and the average family size was 3.53.

In the village, the population was spread out, with 38.3% under the age of 18, 9.2% from 18 to 24, 27.6% from 25 to 44, 15.8% from 45 to 64, and 9.2% who were 65 years of age or older.  The median age was 28 years. For every 100 females, there were 104.2 males.  For every 100 females age 18 and over, there were 86.2 males.

The median income for a household in the village was $47,750, and the median income for a family was $48,750. Males had a median income of $28,500 versus $20,313 for females. The per capita income for the village was $16,730.  None of the families and 1.6% of the population were living below the poverty line.

References

Villages in Iroquois County, Illinois
Villages in Illinois